Dabboo Ratnani (born Dhaporshankh Ratnani) is an Indian fashion and commercial photographer, known for his annual calendar, first published in 1999. He has shot cover photographs for magazines including  Better Homes and Gardens.

Biography
Born on 24 December, he practiced photography as a young man in Gujarat near Kashyap Makadia's house, training together with Naren Sundar. He has been working independently since 1994.

Work
Ratnani is a portrait and celebrity photographer in Indian cinema. His induction into the world of photography came about largely by chance. Films got Ratnani editorial work, which in turn got him model portfolios, which led him to advertising. His work has been used for film advertising and publicity campaigns.

In 2006, he was in the jury for the Miss India contest. Ratnani was a mentor for the India's Next Top Model show, which aired on MTV India. In 2020 Ratnani also got featured in the N4M List of Top 10 fashion photographers of India

Calendar
Ratnani's best known work is his annual calendar. He has helped create a trend of collectible celebrity calendars in India, after the fashion of the Pirelli Calendar. He is one of a number of photographers with calendars widely covered in the media. Over the years Bollywood stars have appeared on his calendar. Every year the launch of the calendar features celebrities, 24 of them for each year. 18 of the 24 celebrities, including Amitabh Bachchan, Shahrukh Khan, Bipasha Basu, Arjun Rampal and Abhishek Bachchan, are a constant feature on his calendar. For the 2012 edition, Ratnani shot a video with some behind-the-scenes moments for each celebrity, which were made available on YouTube.

Film publicity
Ratnani has taken publicity stills for films like Om Shanti Om, Aatish, Blackmail, Fiza, Hera Pheri, Legend of Bhagat Singh, Aawara Pagal Deewana, Jhankaar Beats, Jism, Jo Bole So Nihaal, Kaho Naa... Pyaar Hai, .

Magazines
He has shot cover photographs for magazines including Better Homes and Gardens.

Advertising industry
He also has worked in advertising for various brands.

References

External links

 
Dabboo Ratnani's interview on the calendar from Mid-Day

Indian photographers
Living people
Year of birth missing (living people)